Prosopochrysini is a tribe of soldier flies in the family Stratiomyidae. There are about 9 genera and at least 40 described species in Prosopochrysini.

Genera
These nine genera belong to the tribe Prosopochrysini:
 Acanthasargus White, 1914 i c g
 Cyphoprosopa James, 1975 i c g
 Exochostoma Macquart, 1842 i c g
 Hoplistopsis James, 1950 i c g
 Myxosargus Brauer, 1882 i c g b
 Nothomyia Loew, 1869 i c g b
 Prosopochrysa Meijere, 1907 i c g
 Rhaphiocerina Lindner, 1936 i c g
Data sources: i = ITIS, c = Catalogue of Life, g = GBIF, b = Bugguide.net

References

Further reading

External links

 
 

Stratiomyidae